Diospyros foxworthyi is a tree in the family Ebenaceae. Inflorescences bear up to 15 flowers. The tree is named for the American botanist F. W. Foxworthy. Habitat is lowland mixed dipterocarp forests. D. foxworthyi is found in Peninsular Malaysia and Borneo.

References

foxworthyi
Plants described in 1933
Trees of Peninsular Malaysia
Trees of Borneo